XXXY is a short documentary directed by Porter Gale and Laleh Soomekh.

The film features two people born intersex: San Francisco bicycle messenger Kristi Bruce and clinical psychologist Tiger Devore. The full movie is available online.

Synopsis

Kristi Bruce (now Jim Ambrose) and Howard Devore tell their stories. Jorge Daaboul, Medical Director of Pediatric Endocrinology, Diabetes & Metabolism at Florida Hospital for Children, provides a clinical perspective. Kristi's parents, Alice and John, discuss their experience raising a child born with a variation of sex anatomy.

Reception

Widely praised, XXXY received a number of awards including the 2001 Student Academy Award for Best Documentary, and the Student Award for Best Documentary at the 6th Annual Palm Springs International Festival of Short Films. The film was recommended viewing for the PlanetOut.com Second Queer Short Film Festival, and went on to screen at more than a dozen national and international film festivals.

Winston Wilde, Professor of Human Sexuality and Behavioral Sciences at Santa Monica College called the movie, "the finest film on the issues of intersex Americans, and an indispensable tool for instructors of Human Sexuality, Gender Identity, and Social Psychology."

Filmmaker Magazine called XXXY  "essential filmmaking ... the film's stripped down quality — talking heads, the occasional shot of a childhood home, or Kristi on a bike — means there's nothing to interfere with the pair's stories; the impact is profound."

Demonstrating continued relevance, The New Yorker published a feature on XXXY, "A New Era for Intersex Rights" on December 30, 2013.

Awards
 Best Documentary - 2001 Student Academy Awards 
 Finalist - PlanetOut.com Gay & Lesbian Online Movie Awards
 Jury Award Winner - New York Exposition of Short Film and Video
 Best Student Documentary Award - Palm Springs Shorts Film Festival
 Honorable Mention  - Directors Guild of America
 Honorable Mention - Making Waves Film Festival
 Honoree - Louisville Film and Video Festival
 Honoree - San Francisco Gay and Lesbian Intl. Film Festival
 Honoree - Western Psychological Association
 Screened at more than a dozen national and international film festivals

See also
 Intersex
 Intersex human rights
 Intersex rights in the United States
 Self-determination
 Bodily integrity
 Hermaphrodite

References

External links
 
 
 Impossible Hermaphrodites

2000 films
2000 short documentary films
American independent films
Documentary films about human rights
Documentary films about intersex
2000 LGBT-related films
2000s English-language films
2000 independent films
American short documentary films
2000s American films